Moularès (romanized: Om Laarayes ) is a town and commune in the Gafsa Governorate, Tunisia.  At the 2004 census, it had a population of 24,487.

See also
List of cities in Tunisia

References

Communes of Tunisia
Populated places in Gafsa Governorate